Høgvagltindene is a mountain group on the border of Lom Municipality in Innlandet county and Luster Municipality in Vestland county, Norway. The group includes three main peaks: Vestre Høgvagltinden, Midtre Høgvagltinden, and Austre Høgvagltinden. The mountains are located in the Jotunheimen mountains within Jotunheimen National Park. The mountains are surrounded by several other notable mountains including Kyrkja, Kyrkjeoksli, and Langvasshøi to the northeast; Skarddalstinden and Skarddalseggi to the southeast; Rauddalstindane to the southwest; and Stehøi and Stetinden to the northwest.

See also
List of mountains of Norway by height

References

Jotunheimen
Lom, Norway
Mountains of Innlandet